Rais Zinurovich Sitdikov (born 30 November 1988) is a former Russian professional football player.

Club career
He played 3 seasons in the Russian Football National League for FC Yenisey Krasnoyarsk.

External links
 
 

1988 births
Living people
Russian footballers
Association football midfielders
FC Yenisey Krasnoyarsk players